The men's 100 metre butterfly event at the 1980 Summer Olympics was held on 22 and 23 July at the Swimming Pool at the Olimpiysky Sports Complex.

Records
Prior to this competition, the existing world and Olympic records were as follows.

Results

Heats

Semifinals

Final

References

B
Men's 100 metre butterfly
Men's events at the 1980 Summer Olympics